Blue Point may refer to:
 Blue Point, New York 
 Blue Point Brewing Company
 Blue point, a color pattern of some Siamese cats
 Blue Point (horse) (born 2014), thoroughbred racehorse
 The eastern oyster (Crassostrea virginica), also called the bluepoint oyster
 Bluepoint Games
 Literal translation of the electric equipment manufacturer Blaupunkt